Alex Vincent Chupungco Medina (born May 26, 1986) is a Filipino film and television actor. He is known for his roles in various indie films. He portrayed Diego/Joshua in the soap opera Ina, Kapatid, Anak. He is the son of Pen Medina and brother of Ping Medina.

Medina won the best actor award in the Cinema One Originals Film Festival for the film Palitan.

Background
Medina was born and raised in Manila, Philippines. He is the son of veteran Filipino actor Pen Medina. He has three brothers: Karl, Ping and Victor, who are also actors. He also has four younger siblings: Japs, Victor, Zeth and JL.

Medina studied Marketing and Corporate Communications at San Beda College until he dropped out to focus on his acting career.

Career

Early works – 2012
Medina started acting in student films for fine arts majors at the University of the Philippines, Diliman. His on-screen debut was in the film Concerto in 2008. This film, set in the World War II era, was part of the Cinemalaya Independent Film Festival and received accolades and positive feedback.

In 2009, Medina signed a management agreement with Manny Valera. He subsequently played supporting roles in several films including Fidel and Iliw.

In 2011, he was cast in the film Ka Oryang playing a minor role, but he was brought to the attention of various directors and independent film makers when his later films received accolades locally and internationally.

In 2012, he starred in the UP-Diliman film Balang Araw directed by Archie Dimaculangan. The following month, he worked on several different indie films including Mariposa: Sa Hawla Ng Gabi and Pascalina.

Medina's next big role was in Palitan, in which he played the main character Nestor, a desperate, underdog employee who is deeply in debt to his boss. Nestor was a daring role and featured his first appearance in an erotic scene in a motion picture. His work in the film was well received by critics. His last indie film in 2012 was Supremo, in which he played a supporting role.

In the 2012 Cinema One Originals Film Festival, Medina's indie films won various awards including: Mariposa: Sa Hawla Ng Gabi which won an award for Michael Espanol for Best Production Design; Pascalina, and Palitan for which he won Best Actor while his co-star Mara Lopez won Best Actress.

After this win, ABS-CBN picked Medina for the role of Diego in the hit prime time drama series Ina, Kapatid, Anak, his first television appearance. Medina's role was initially supposed to be played by Rayver Cruz, but he turned it down because of his busy schedule.

2013–present
Medina's breakthrough performance in ABS-CBN's Ina, Kapatid, Anak generally received positive reviews from critics. He played the role Diego, the rebellious and vengeful long-lost son of Theresa (played by Cherry Pie Picache). While shooting from January to May 2013, he simultaneously taped another indie film Babagwa, which was also an entry for the 9th Cinemalaya Independent Film Festival. Medina guested in afternoon fantasy drama series My Little Juan.

In 2014, Medina appeared in Two Wives.

Filmography

Television

Films

References

External links

 
 

1986 births
ABS-CBN personalities
Star Magic
GMA Network personalities
Filipino male television actors
Living people
Filipino people of Kapampangan descent
Tagalog people
San Beda University alumni
Male actors from Manila
Male actors from Metro Manila